Brecon and Radnorshire is a constituency of the Senedd. It elects one Member of the Senedd by the first past the post method of election. Also, however, it is one of eight constituencies in the Mid and West Wales electoral region, which elects four additional members, in addition to eight constituency members, to produce a degree of proportional representation for the region as a whole. It is currently represented by James Evans MS, of the Conservatives who has been the MS since May 2021.

Boundaries

1999 to 2007 
The constituency was created for the first election to the Assembly, in 1999, with the name and boundaries of the Brecon and Radnorshire Westminster constituency. 
It is entirely within the preserved county of Powys, and one of three Powys constituencies. 
Also, it is one of eight constituencies in the Mid and West Wales electoral region.

The other Powys constituencies are Montgomeryshire and Clwyd South. 
Montgomeryshire is also entirely within the preserved county of Powys, and within the Mid and West Wales region. 
Clwyd South is partly, and mostly, a Clwyd constituency, and within the North Wales electoral region.

The region consists of the eight constituencies of Brecon and Radnorshire, Carmarthen East and Dinefwr, Carmarthen West and South Pembrokeshire, Ceredigion, Llanelli, Meirionnydd Nant Conwy, Montgomeryshire and Preseli Pembrokeshire.

From 2007 
Constituency boundaries changed from the 2007 Assembly election, as did regional boundaries. Brecon and Radnorshire remained a Powys constituency, however, and one of eight constituencies in the Mid and West Wales electoral region.

Brecon and Radnorshire is one of two constituencies covering Powys, both entirely within the preserved county, and both within the Mid and West Wales region. 
The other Powys constituency is Montgomeryshire.

The Mid and West Wales region consists of the constituencies of Brecon and Radnorshire, Carmarthen East and Dinefwr, Carmarthen West and South Pembrokeshire, Ceredigion, Dwyfor Meirionnydd, Llanelli, Montgomeryshire and Preseli Pembrokeshire.

For Westminster purposes, the same new constituency boundaries became effective for the 2010 United Kingdom general election.

Members of the Senedd

Voting 
In general elections for the Senedd, each voter has two votes. The first vote may be used to vote for a candidate to become the Member of the Senedd for the voter's constituency, elected by the first past the post system. The second vote may be used to vote for a regional closed party list of candidates. Additional member seats are allocated from the lists by the d'Hondt method, with constituency results being taken into account in the allocation.

Elections

Elections in the 2020s

Elections in the 2010s 

Regional ballots rejected: 311

Elections in the 2000s 

2003 Electorate: 53,739
Regional ballots rejected: 282

Elections in the 1990s

References 

Senedd constituencies in the Mid and West Wales electoral region
1999 establishments in Wales
Constituencies established in 1999
Politics of Powys